Agrocarbon is the international brand name of biochar products produced by 3Ragrocabon. 3Ragrocarbon is owned and operated by Terra Humanities LTD, a Swedish ecological-innovation technology and engineering company. 3RAgrocarbon utilizes patented 3R zero-emission Pyrolysis to create environmentally friendly bio-char and soil-nutrient enrichment products. The firm is headquartered in Hungary where its main production facility is located. The company is supported by, and partnered with the European Union on several projects focused on eco-safe agricultural and soil nutrient initiatives.  The Agrocarbon is applied in all formulations, from stand alone biofertilizer to any combination as compost or soil activator. The refined and formulated Agrocarbon products are multi effect used for sustainable soil and carbon negative environmental and climate protection improvements. This includes economical food crop production and forest nursery, biological pest control, natural fertilization, soil moisture retention,  restoration of soil biodiversity and natural balance.

Agrocarbon Production

Agrocarbons are created using 3R slow pyrolysis. The process entails the input of high quality plant or animal biomass/waste in to a large horizontal rotating kiln. The kiln is specifically engineered for this process and is then heated between 450 °C - 850° with varying core temperatures. This causes the reductive thermal decomposition of the biomass input and creates Agrocarbons which can be utilized for a number of agricultural and industrial purposes ranging from soil enhancers to renewable energy. The 3R pyrolysis process is an original development and innovation of Terra Humana ltd. The development of this process is very substantial as most other pyrolysis methods are unable to operate efficiently on an industrial scale. 3R pyrolysis technology was proven and demonstrated at a technical readiness level of 8 and will soon reach level 9. The purpose of this process is to add value to otherwise wasted animal and plant byproducts.

Zero Emission

All of the materials and gases used in the Agrocarbon development process are reused and recycled. Gases resulting from the 3R pyrolysis process are captured and chemically processed to create liquid bio-fuels. 3r Agrocarbon meets all environmental standards of the European Union and United States.

Product differentiation

3R agrocarbon is used as a soil nutrient enhancer to help recover phosphorus. Phosphorus is an element that is required for all organic life and is imperative to healthy plant growth. Most agricultural producers utilize phosphorus fertilizers, however these types of fertilizers are created using phosphate rocks which are non-renewable resources. 3R agrocarbon is rich in phosphorus due to its biomass inputs. In addition, the porous structure of the Agrocarbon bone-char is ideal for microbes beneficial to crop growth and can also be utilized to carry biological control agents.

See also 

 Biomass
 Biochar
 Pyrolysis
 Phosphorus

References

External links 
 3R Agrocarbon Website

Sustainable agriculture